Jillellamudi is a village in Guntur district of the Indian state of Andhra Pradesh. It is located in Bapatla mandal in Tenali revenue division. Jillellamudi became popular because of spiritual leader Anasuya Devī also known as Jillellamudi Amma" / Viswajanani (meaning "mother of all").

Geography 

Governance 

Jillellamudi Gram Panchayat is the local self-government of the village. It is divided into wards and each ward is represented by a ward member.

Education 

As per the school information report for the academic year 2018–19, the village has a total of 2 schools. These include one MPP and one private school.

See also 
List of villages in Guntur district

References 

Villages in Guntur district